KCAR may refer to:

 KCAR-FM, a radio station (104.3 FM) licensed to serve Galena, Kansas, United States
 KHDY (AM), a radio station (1350 AM) licensed to serve Clarksville, Texas, United States, which held the call sign KCAR until 2018
 Caribou Municipal Airport, ICAO airport code KCAR
 King Cetshwayo Artillery Regiment, an artillery regiment of the South African Army

See also
 K-Car